Ironbark is a common name of a number of species in three taxonomic groups within the genus Eucalyptus that have dark, deeply furrowed bark.

Instead of being shed annually as in many of the other species of Eucalyptus, the dead bark accumulates on the trees, forming the fissures. It becomes rough after drying out and becomes impregnated with kino (red gum), a dark red tree sap exuded by the tree. The tree is so named for the apparent resemblance of its bark to iron slag. The bark is resistant to fire and heat and protects the living tissue within the trunk and branches from fire. In cases of extreme fire, where leaves and shoots are removed, the protective bark aids in protecting epicormic buds which allow the tree to reshoot.

Being a very dense, hard wood, a length of ironbark is often used as a bug shoe on the bottom of a ship's skeg to protect it from shipworms. Ironbark was widely used in the piles of 19th and early 20th century bridges and wharves in New Zealand.

Examples of ironbark species 
 Eucalyptus ancophila L.A.S.Johnston & K.D.Hill
 Eucalyptus atrata L.A.S.Johnston & K.D.Hill Herberton ironbark, blue-leaved ironbark
 Eucalyptus beaniana L.A.S.Johnson & K.D.Hill Bean's ironbark
 Eucalyptus caleyi Maiden Caley's ironbark, drooping ironbark
 Eucalyptus corynodes A.R. Bean & Brooker
 Eucalyptus crebra F.Muell. narrow-leaved ironbark or narrow-leaved red ironbark
 Eucalyptus cullenii Cambage Cullen's ironbark
 Eucalyptus decolor A.R.Bean & Brooker
 Eucalyptus decorticans (F.M.Bailey) Maiden gum-topped ironbark
 Eucalyptus dura L.A.S. Johnson & K.D.Hill
 Eucalyptus exilipes Brooker & A.R.Bean fine-leaved ironbark
 Eucalyptus farinosa K.D.Hill
 Eucalyptus fibrosa F. Muell. broad-leaved (red) ironbark, blue-leaved ironbark
 Eucalyptus fusiformis Boland & Kleinig grey ironbark 
 Eucalyptus granitica L.A.S.Johnson & K.D.Hill granite ironbark
 Eucalyptus indurata Brooker & Hopper ironbark
 Eucalyptus jensenii Maiden Wandi ironbark
 Eucalyptus melanoleuca S.T.Blake Yarraman ironbark or nanango ironbark
 Eucalyptus melanophloia F.Muell. silver-leaved ironbark
 Eucalyptus ophitica L.A.S.Johnson & K.D.Hill serpentine ironbark 
 Eucalyptus panda S.T. Blake tumbledown ironbark, Yetman ironbark
 Eucalyptus paniculata Sm. grey ironbark
 Eucalyptus paedoglauca L.A.S.Johnson & Blaxell Mount Stuart ironbark
 Eucalyptus placita L.A.S.Johnson & K.D.Hill grey ironbark
 Eucalyptus quadricostata Brooker square-fruited ironbark
 Eucalyptus rhombica A.R.Bean & Brooker
 Eucalyptus scopulorum  K.D.Hill
 Eucalyptus shirleyi Maiden Shirleys's silver leaved ironbark
 Eucalyptus sicilifolia L.A.S.Johnson & K.D.Hill
 Eucalyptus siderophloia Benth. northern grey ironbark
 Eucalyptus sideroxylon A.Cunn. ex Woolls mugga ironbark
 Eucalyptus staigeriana F.Muell. ex Bailey lemon-scented ironbark
 Eucalyptus suffulgens L.A.S.Johnson & K.D.Hill
 Eucalyptus taurina A.R.Bean & Brooker Helidon ironbark
 Eucalyptus tricarpa (L.A.S.Johnson) L.A.S.Johnson & K.D.Hill red ironbark
 Eucalyptus virens Brooker & A.R.Bean shiny-leaved ironbark
 Eucalyptus whitei Maiden & Blakely White's ironbark

See also
Ironwood

References

External links

Eucalyptus